is a Japanese anime screenwriter. After serving as an episode screenwriter, he was put in charge of all the screenwriting for Seraph of the End. Since then, he has also done screenwriting for many other series, of which notables include Attack on Titan, Mob Psycho 100, Dorohedoro, Summer Time Rendering, and Jujutsu Kaisen. He mostly works with Wit Studio and MAPPA.

Biography
Hiroshi Seko was born in Nagoya, Japan. After doing episode scripts for Panty & Stocking with Garterbelt, Attack on Titan, and Terror in Resonance, Seko was put in charge of doing all the screenwriting in the anime adaptation of Seraph of the End. Seko also wrote the Attack on Titan: Lost Girls novel. In 2016, Seko did the screenwriting for the anime adaptation of Mob Psycho 100, which was nominated for anime of the year and won the award for best action series at the first Crunchyroll Anime Awards.

In 2019, he did the screenwriting for the anime adaptation of Vinland Saga and the second season of Mob Psycho 100, both of which were nominated for anime of the year at the Crunchyroll Anime Awards. Vinland Saga also won the award for best drama. In 2020, he did the screenwriting for Jujutsu Kaisen and Dorohedoro. At the Crunchyroll Anime Awards, the former won anime of the year, while the latter was nominated for anime of the year and best fantasy.

Works

Television series
  (2010) (episode screenwriter)
  (2013–present) (episode screenwriter (season 1–3); screenwriter (season 4))
  (2014) (episode screenwriter)
 (2015) (screenwriter)
 (2015–2016) (screenwriter)
  (2016–2022) (screenwriter)
  (2017) (screenwriter)
 Banana Fish (2018) (screenwriter)
  (2019–2023) (screenwriter)
  (2020) (screenwriter)
  (2020) (screenwriter)
  (2020–2021) (screenwriter)
  (2021) (screenwriter)
  (2022) (screenwriter)
  (2022) (screenwriter)
  (2023) (screenwriter)

Web series
  (2019) (screenwriter)
  (2022) (screenwriter)
 Gamera: Rebirth (TBA) (screenwriter)

Films
  (2015) (screenplay)
  (2020) (screenwriter)
  (2021) (screenwriter)

Novels
  (2014)

References

External links
 

Anime screenwriters
Japanese novelists
Japanese screenwriters
Living people
People from Nagoya
Year of birth missing (living people)